Deh Dam Barm Murzard (also Romanized as Deh Dam Barm Mūrzard) is a village in Margown Rural District, Margown District, Boyer-Ahmad County, Kohgiluyeh and Boyer-Ahmad Province, Iran. At the 2006 census, its population was 44, in 8 families.

References 

Populated places in Boyer-Ahmad County